Hallgrímur Sveinsson  (5 April 1841 – 16 December 1909) was an Icelandic prelate who serviced as Bishop of Iceland from 1889 till 1908.

Biography
Hallgrímur was born on 5 April 1841 in Blöndudalshólar, Iceland, the son of Sveinn Níelsson, a member of parliament, and Guðrún Jónsdóttir. He graduated from the Reykjavik School in 1863 and from the University of Copenhagen on 1870. Between 1870 and 1871 he studied at the seminary in Copenhagen. In 1971 he joined became a member of the Reykjavik Cathedral priests. That same year he also married Elina Marie Bolette Fevejle. They had four children, Friðrik, Guðrún, Sveinn and Ágústa. Between 1885-1887 and 1893-1905 he was a member of the Althing, the Icelandic parliament, for the Framfaraflokkurinn party and the old Framsóknarflokkurinn party. He served as speaker of the Althing from 1897 to 1899. On 16 April 1889 he was appointed Bishop of Iceland and was consecrated on 25 May in Copenhagen. He retired on 19 September 1908.

References 

Hallgrímur Sveinsson
19th-century Lutheran bishops
1841 births
1909 deaths
Speakers of the Althing